Jan Malte Metzelder (born 19 May 1982) is a German former professional footballer who played as a centre-back.

He appeared in the Bundesliga for Borussia Dortmund, but spent most of his career in the lower leagues.

Football career
Born in Haltern, North Rhine-Westphalia, Metzelder made his professional debut with SC Preußen Münster in 2001, and two years later moved to Borussia Dortmund to play alongside his older brother Christoph. However, he appeared very rarely for the first team, amassing only nine Bundesliga appearances – all in 2003–04 – and adding two minutes in a 2–1 away win against FK Austria Wien for the UEFA Cup.

In 2005, Metzelder left Dortmund and joined VfR Aalen in the Regionalliga Süd (then third division). Two years later he stayed in that tier, being instrumental in FC Ingolstadt 04's promotion to the second level in his first season; he left the latter club in July 2014 at the age of 32, after no competitive appearances whatsoever in his last two years.

Personal life
Metzelder's older brother, Christoph, was also a footballer (and a centre back), and both played for Borussia Dortmund, with his sibling also playing three years at Real Madrid and representing Germany on about 50 occasions, helping the team finish second at the 2002 FIFA World Cup.

References

External links

1982 births
Living people
People from Haltern
Sportspeople from Münster (region)
Footballers from North Rhine-Westphalia
German footballers
Association football defenders
Bundesliga players
2. Bundesliga players
3. Liga players
TuS Haltern players
SpVgg Erkenschwick players
SC Preußen Münster players
Borussia Dortmund II players
Borussia Dortmund players
VfR Aalen players
FC Ingolstadt 04 players